Henri Hébrard de Villeneuve (10 September 1848 – 22 March 1925) was a French fencer. He competed in the individual épée event at the 1900 Summer Olympics.

References

External links
 

1848 births
1925 deaths
People from Riom
French male épée fencers
Olympic fencers of France
Fencers at the 1900 Summer Olympics
Sportspeople from Puy-de-Dôme
20th-century French people